Nicholas Hankey Smith (1771–1837) Son of Benjamin and Charlotte Smith, the former a rich West Indian Merchant, the latter a celebrated author. He was a Persian Ambassador and British Resident in the Persian Gulf commanding the Presidencies of Bushiu, Baghdad and Bussoia, married Anni Petroose, daughter of Khan Petroose, a Persian Minister and grand niece to the late King Fullah Alli Shah.

1771 births
1837 deaths
British diplomats